Steve Gay (born September 1, 1947 in La Paz, Bolivia) is a former U.S. collegiate soccer player. He played as a forward and was on the U.S. soccer team at the 1972 Summer Olympics. He went on to coach the UCLA men's soccer team from 1975 to 1979.

Club career
Gay attended NAIA Westmont College, located in Santa Barbara, California, where he starred on the men’s soccer team from 1966 to 1969.  He holds several school scoring records including most points in a season with 80 (30 goals and 8 assists) in 1968.   He is also the career points leader with 203.   Finally, he scored 88 goals in his four seasons at Westmont.  In 1968, Gay was selected as a third team All American.   He was inducted into the NAIA Soccer Hall of Fame in 1977 and the Westmont Hall of Fame in 1995.  In 1975, he played for the Los Angeles Aztecs during the North American Soccer League's indoor season.

1972 Olympic team
In 1971, the U.S. Olympic soccer team began qualification games for the 1972 Summer Olympics.  On July 25, 1971, he scored a hat trick in a 3–0 victory over Bermuda.  The U.S. qualified for the games and Gay was selected to the U.S. roster.  The U.S. went 0–2–1 in group play and did not make the second round.  Gay played the second game, a 3–0 loss to Malaysia when he came on for John Carenza.  In the third game, a 7–0 blow out at the hands of the host West German team, Gay started the game, but came out for Zylker.

Coaching UCLA
In 1975, UCLA hired Gay to coach its men’s soccer team.  Over the five seasons Gay spent as head coach, he compiled a 72–34–10 record before handing the team over to former assistant Sigi Schmid in 1980.

Gay has continued to coach youth soccer after founding the Arizona Soccer Camp in 1978 with Alan Meeder.

References

External links
 
 Los Angeles Aztecs stats

1947 births
Living people
American soccer coaches
American soccer players
Bolivian emigrants to the United States
Los Angeles Aztecs players
North American Soccer League (1968–1984) indoor players
Olympic soccer players of the United States
Footballers at the 1972 Summer Olympics
UCLA Bruins men's soccer coaches
Westmont Warriors men's soccer players
Footballers from La Paz
Association football forwards